Yasuko Nguyen Thanh (born June 30, 1971) is a Canadian writer and guitarist. She has lived in Canada, Mexico, Germany, and Latin America and she was named one of ten CBC Books' writers to watch in 2013. Thanh completed a Bachelor of Arts as well as a Masters of Fine Arts from the University of Victoria. She performs with the bands Jukebox Jezebel and 12 Gauge Facial, and lives with her two children in Victoria, British Columbia.

Early life 
She was born in Victoria, British Columbia, to a German mother and a Vietnamese father. At age 15, Thanh dropped out of school and lived on the streets. Previous to winning the Journey Prize for her short story Floating Like the Dead in 2009, Thanh earned her living as a busker in Vancouver.

Writing 
Thanh's first novel Mysterious Fragrance of the Yellow Mountains was published in 2016 by Hamish Hamilton, Penguin, Canada. The novel won the 2016 Rogers Writers' Trust Fiction Prize.

Thanh's short story collection, Floating Like the Dead (McClelland & Stewart 2012), which includes the Journey Prize-winning title story, was on Quill & Quire'''s list of best books of 2012. The National Post wrote that "Yasuko Thanh impresses above all with the thematic complexity of her approach."

Her early work was published in literary journals such as Prairie Fire, Descant, Fireweed, The Fiddlehead and PRISM International.

Her newest book, the memoir Mistakes to Run With, was published in April 2019.

Thanh is in the process of completing her second novel, tentatively titled, Teddy's Blow Off Attraction, which is based on the life and relationships of Julia Pastrana.

 Awards 
The short story "Floating Like the Dead" earned Thanh the 2009 Journey Prize. The book Floating Like the Dead (2012) was nominated for the Ethel Wilson Fiction Prize, BC's award for best fiction and was shortlisted for the sixteenth annual Danuta Gleed Literary Award. Thanh was also a finalist for the David Adams Richards Prize from the Writers' Federation of New Brunswick, the Canada Council for the Arts' Future Generations Millennium Prize, and the Hudson Prize. The short story "Spring-blade Knife" from Floating Like The Dead'' won the 2013 Arthur Ellis Award for Best Crime Short Story.

References

External links 

1971 births
Living people
Writers from Victoria, British Columbia
University of Victoria alumni
Canadian women novelists
21st-century Canadian novelists
Canadian writers of Asian descent
Canadian people of Vietnamese descent
Canadian people of German descent
21st-century Canadian women writers
Canadian memoirists
21st-century memoirists
Canadian women memoirists